Buhasa Airport  is a small private airfield operated by the Abu Dhabi Company for Onshore Oil Operations and serves the oil field at Buhasa, Abu Dhabi, UAE.

References

Airports in the United Arab Emirates